The boys' ski cross event at the 2016 Winter Youth  Olympics took place on 15 February at the Hafjell Freepark.

Results

Qualification
The qualification was held at 13:35.

Group heats

Semifinals
Heat 1

Heat 2

Finals
The final was held at 15:40.
Small final

Big final

References

 

Freestyle skiing at the 2016 Winter Youth Olympics